This list of people from Edmonton, London includes people were born, educated, or lived in Edmonton, London:
 John Clayton Adams (landscape artist)
 Gladys Aylward (Protestant missionary)
 Tony Barber (musician)
 Percival Harry Barton (footballer)
 John Beck  (footballer)
 Dudley Benjafield (racecar driver and alumnus of the University of London)
 Black the Ripper (rapper)
 Eddie Bovington (footballer)
 Karren Brady (businesswoman)
 Jack Burkett (footballer)
 Albert Cadwell (footballer)
 Robert Cecil (statesman)
 John Christie (recipient of the Victoria Cross)
 Benjamin Clementine (singer and poet)
 Cyril Coaffee (athlete)
 John Cole (fashion photographer)
 Ritchie Coster (actor)
 Charles Coward (World War II hero)
 Lewis Cozens (railway historian and author)
 Steve Crabb, middle distance athlete
 Jimmy Dimmock (footballer)
 Florence Dugdale (writer)
 David Evans (British politician)
 Ray Evans (footballer)
 Neale Fenn (footballer)
 Wally Fielding (footballer)
 Bruce Forsyth (entertainer)
 John French (photographer)
 Michael Garner (actor)
 Akin Gazi (actor)
 Anthony Giddens (sociologist)
 David W. Goodall (botanist and ecologist)
 Frederick Grace (boxer)
 Bobby Graham (musician)
 Florence Green (World War I veteran)
 Nigel Havers (actor)
 Chas Hodges  (musician)	
 David Jason (actor)
 Michael Keating (actor)
 John Keats (poet)
 Jo Kuffour (footballer)
 Charles Lamb (essayist)	
 Larry Lamb (actor)
 Mary Lamb (writer)
 Derek Lampe (footballer)
 Ron Lewin (footballer)
 Derek Lewis (footballer)
 Arthur Lowdell (footballer)
 Tony Marchi (footballer)
 Peter Meaden (publicist)	
 Les Medley (footballer)
 Dave Murray (Iron Maiden) (musician)
 Malcolm Needs (screenwriter)
 Kevin Nugent (footballer)
 Joe O'Cearuill (footballer)
 Reece Oxford (footballer)
 Kenneth Pestell (cricketer)
 Omer Riza (footballer)
 Paul Rodgers (footballer)
 Leonard Roth (mathematician)
 Billy Sage (1893–1968), professional footballer
 Lee Smelt (footballer)
 John Thomas Smith (engraver)
 Mike Smith (Dave Clark Five) (musician)
 Norman Smith (producer, musician)
 Jimmy Smy (footballer)
 Jim Standen (footballer)
 Brook Taylor (mathematician)
 Mike Thalassitis (footballer and TV personality)
 Leslie Welch (radio and TV personality)
 Chris Williams (Led Bib)  
B.J. Wilson (original Procol Harum rock drummer)
Tion Wayne (rapper)

Notable people educated in Edmonton
Edmonton County School
Kriss Akabusi (athlete)
Basil Hoskins (actor)
Kevan James (cricketer)
Kelly Johnson (guitarist)
Debbie Kurup (actress)
Larry Lamb (actor)
Roy Strong (historian)
Norman Tebbit (politician)
Ray Winstone (actor)
The Latymer School
 Eileen Atkins (actress)
 Johnny Haynes (footballer)
 Bruce Forsyth (entertainer)
 Clare-Hope Ashitey (actress)
 Syed Kamall, Conservative MEP
 Albert Meltzer, British anarchist
 Tim Pope (film and video director)
 Yorick Wilks, early artificial intelligence researcher
 B.J. Wilson, original drummer with Procol Harum
Other
 Malcolm Needs (screenwriter)

References

Edmonton, London
Lists of people from London